The Tubas Governorate is an administrative district of the Palestine in the northeastern West Bank. Its district capital or muhfaza is the city of Tubas. In 2007, the population was 50,267, raising to 60,927 in 2017.

Localities
There are 23 localities located within the governorate's jurisdiction.

Cities
Tubas

Municipalities
'Aqqaba 
Tammun

Village councils
Bardala
Ein al-Beida
Kardala
Ras al-Far'a
Tayasir
Wadi al-Far'a

Village clusters
al-Bikai'a

Refugee camps
Far'a

See also 
 Governorates of Palestine

References 

 
Governorates of the Palestinian National Authority in the West Bank